Cornelius Bolton (1 October 1751 – 11 March 1829) was an Irish landowner and politician.

Biography
The eldest son and heir of Cornelius Bolton, he was Member of Parliament for the city of Waterford from 1776 to 1783, High Sheriff of County Waterford in 1778 and 1815 and Mayor of Waterford in 1810 and 1816. He was also MP for Lanesborough from 1783 to 1790.

He built Faithlegg House (now a hotel) near Waterford in 1783 and married Eliza MacDonnell in 1789, with whom he had 3 sons and 3 daughters.

References

1751 births
1829 deaths
High Sheriffs of County Waterford
Irish MPs 1776–1783
Irish MPs 1783–1790
Members of the Parliament of Ireland (pre-1801) for County Waterford constituencies
Members of the Parliament of Ireland (pre-1801) for County Longford constituencies